Božinović is a surname of Serbo-Croatian language origin. Notable people with the surname include:

Boško Božinović (1949−2018), Croatian middle-distance runner and conditioning coach
Davor Božinović (born 1961), Croatian diplomat and politician
Francisco Bozinovic (1959−2023), Croatian-Chilean biologist and academic
Vidoja Božinović (born 1955), Serbian musician

See also
 Božinov, surname
 Božović, surname
 Božić, surname
Božinovac, village in Knjaževac, Serbia
Božanovići, village in Kalinovik, Republika Srpska, Bosnia and Herzegovina

Croatian surnames
Serbian surnames